The  Persian snake skink (Ophiomorus persicus) is a species of skink endemic to Iran. A specimen collected in 1999 was found on sandy clay soil near Artemisia shrubs. It was originally described in 1867 as Hemipodion persicum.

References

Ophiomorus
Reptiles of Iran
Endemic fauna of Iran
Reptiles described in 1867
Taxa named by Franz Steindachner